The Friends of Mr Cairo is the second album by Jon and Vangelis, released in 1981. There are two editions of the album, with different sleeves. Both were released in 1981 within a few weeks of each other. The title track, "The Friends of Mr Cairo", peaked at No. 1 on the Canadian singles chart in late 1981, though the track was not a hit elsewhere. The second edition of the album includes the single "I'll Find My Way Home", which according to Anderson was added in response to poor initial sales of the album, and which stayed in the Swiss charts for 14 weeks and peaked at No. 1 on 7 March 1982. It also peaked at No. 6 in the UK. The album was #2 in Canada for 3 weeks, and was #15 in the Best of 1981. "State of Independence" was later a hit single for Donna Summer, and a decade later for Moodswings with Chrissie Hynde on vocal. Anderson also later re-recorded that song on his solo album Change We Must, released in 1994.

The title track and its accompanying music video serve as an ode to classic Hollywood films of the 1930s and 1940s, including references to the classic film noir The Maltese Falcon. Joel Cairo (Mr Cairo) is the character played by Peter Lorre in The Maltese Falcon. The track incorporates sound effects and voice impressions of the stars of the era, most notably Lorre, Humphrey Bogart, Sydney Greenstreet, and Jimmy Stewart.

Track listing

First edition
Side A
 "The Friends of Mr Cairo" – 12:04
 "Back to School" – 5:06
 "Outside And Inside" – 5:00

Side B
 "State of Independence" – 7:53
 "Beside" – 4:08
 "The Mayflower" – 6:35

Second edition
Side A
 "I'll Find My Way Home" – 4:29
 "State of Independence" – 7:53
 "Beside" – 4:08
 "The Mayflower" – 6:35

Side B
 "The Friends of Mr Cairo" – 12:04
 "Back to School" – 5:06
 "Outside And Inside" – 5:00

CD
 "I'll Find My Way Home" – 4:29
 "State of Independence" – 7:53
 "Beside" – 4:08
 "The Mayflower" – 6:35
 "The Friends of Mr. Cairo" – 12:04
 "Back to School" – 5:06
 "Outside of This (Inside of That)" – 5:00

Personnel
 Jon Anderson – vocals, composer
 Vangelis – composer, producer, arranger, performer
 Dick Morrissey – saxophone, flute
 David Coker – voices
 Sally Grace – voices (5)
 Dennis Clarke - saxophone
 Claire Hamill – backing vocals (6)
 Carol Kenyon – backing vocals
Technical
 Roger Roche – engineer
 Raine Shine – engineer
 Alwyn Clayden – sleeve
 Veronique Skawinska – photography

Charts

Weekly charts

Year-end charts

Certifications
Album

Singles

References

External links
 Review on Vangelis Movements
 Review on allmusic.com
 

1981 albums
Jon and Vangelis albums
Polydor Records albums
Songs about fictional male characters
Cultural depictions of Humphrey Bogart
Cultural depictions of Peter Lorre